John Jeffries Best (19 March 1914 – 25 May 1994) was a New Zealand rugby union player. He was a member of the New Zealand national side, the All Blacks, on their 1935–36 tour of the British Isles and Canada but broke his collarbone in his first game and only played in six matches on the tour, and did not appear in any of the test matches.

Best died in Blenheim on 25 May 1994, and was buried at Fairhall Cemetery.

References

1914 births
1994 deaths
Rugby union players from Blenheim, New Zealand
People educated at St. Patrick's College, Silverstream
New Zealand rugby union players
New Zealand international rugby union players
Marlborough rugby union players
Waikato rugby union players
Bay of Plenty rugby union players
Rugby union flankers
Burials at Fairhall Cemetery